The Fianarantsoa-Côte Est (FCE) railway is a colonial-built railway in southeast Madagascar that connects the high plateau city of Fianarantsoa to the port-city of Manakara. It is 163 kilometers long and was built by the French between 1926 and 1936 using the forced-labor program SMOTIG. The French used rails and ties taken from Germany as World War I reparations to build the line. Many of the railways still have the date of manufacturing on them dating back to 1893.

This line traverses some of the most threatened habitat in the world. In 2000, back-to-back cyclones caused 280 landslides and 4 major washouts cut service for months until a rehabilitation project was launched with help from USAID, Swiss Railways and others. A study conducted by the Project d'Appui à la Gestion de l'Environnement (PAGE) in 2000 concluded that keeping the train operational helps prevent deforestation to the tune of 97,400 hectares over 20 years. Interviews conducted with villagers during the temporary closure found that they would have no choice but to cut-down their tree-based crops that they shipped to market on the railway and plant rice or cassava instead.

The FCE is currently running, but its aging infrastructure makes it vulnerable to service disruptions caused by broken rails, old rolling stock and landslides caused by cyclones.

The railway crosses the runway of Manakara Airport, one of only three places in the world where a railway crosses a runway at grade.

Stations
 Manakara - port - PK 163.270 – 4 meters
 Ambila - PK 146.267 – 12 meters
 Mizilo Gara - PK 136.850 – 26 meters
 Antsaka - PK 128.200 – 39 meters
 Sahasinaka - PK 118.300 – 39 meters
 Fenomby - PK 106.650 – 190 meters
 Mahabako - PK 99.000 – 195 meters
 Ionilahy - PK 82.700 – 211 meters
 Manampatrana or Ambinany-Manampatrana - PK 78.800 – 206 meters
 Amboanjobe - PK 71.680 – 356 meters
 Tolongoina - PK 61.900 – 390 meters
 Madiorano - PK 54.225 – 609 meters
 Andrambovato - PK 45.278 – 878 meters
 Ranomena - PK 38.520 – 1061 meters
 Ampitambe - PK 28.540 – 1064 meters
 Sahambavy - PK 21.440 – 1079 meters
 Vohimasina - PK 9.510 – 1018 meters
 Fianarantsoa - PK 0 – 1100 meters

Rolling material
 3 locomotives Alsthom BB 242, 243 and 245 
 2 draisines YC 048 et 051
 1 Micheline ZM 
 6 station wagons
 22 freight wagons

In 2020 the FCE received 3 Spanish second hand locomotives Serie_1500_de_Renfe built in 1964.

See also

History of rail transport in Madagascar
Rail transport in Madagascar

References

External links

Metre gauge railways in Madagascar
Rail transport in Madagascar